Milleria is the scientific name of two genera of organisms and may refer to:

Milleria (moth), a genus of insects in the family Zygaenidae
Milleria (plant), a genus of plants in the family Asteraceae